The Actors' & Entertainers' Benevolent Fund of Queensland (Inc) is a registered charity assisting actors, performers, and entertainers in times of dire circumstance. It is commonly known as the Actors' Benevolent Fund, ABF QLD, and The Fund. The Fund is run by an elected committee of industry professionals, with Michael Balk JP as the current president.

History
The Fund was started by Alan Edwards AM MBE in 1975. Charities of this kind have been operating across the world for over a century, including the Actors' Benevolent Fund of NSW and the Victorian Actors' Benevolent Fund.

The Actors' Benevolent Fund of NSW, of which Don Crosby  was the serving president, provided a donation of $500 to seed the charity.

Alan Edwards AM MBE, a prominent figure in local performing arts who was the first artistic director of the established Queensland Theatre Company in 1970, was the inaugural president of the charity. Edwards served in that role until 1994.

Lifetime Achievement Award 
The Fund presents an industry award to recognise excellence and lifetime achievement in the arts in Queensland. It is named in honour of the founding president Alan Edwards. The first award was recognised in 2002.

Recipients of the Alan Edwards Lifetime Achievement Award

References

External links
Actors' & Entertainers' Benevolent Fund of Queensland

Charities based in Australia